Tyra Bolling (born June 27, 1985), better known as Tyra B, is an American singer, songwriter, and dancer. She's best known for her top 40 R&B singles "Country Boy", "Still in Love" and "Givin' Me a Rush" which is her biggest single to date.

Career
Bolling grew up singing with a local group by the name of Kraz'e with her sister and friend.  While the other two singers went to college, Bolling decided to pursue a career as a singer.

In 2005, her singles "Country Boy" and "Still in Love" became Top 40 hits on the Billboard Hot R&B/Hip Hop chart without any support by major record companies. She worked with Chingy on the remix of "Country Boy", produced by PrettyBoy and Bradd Young. Another single "Get No Ooh Wee" was released also that year. Her debut album Introducing Tyra B was scheduled for 2006, but was never released.

In 2007, she began work on her second studio album Past Due which was preceded by the single "Givin' Me a Rush" which became her biggest hit to date. It peaked at #2 on BET's 106 & Park in addition to #36 on Billboard's Hot R&B/Hip Hop Singles and #22 on the Bubbling Under Singles chart. A follow-up single "Get It Poppin'" featuring Soulja Boy was released in January 2008. The album Past Due was pushed back several times and was set to feature appearances by Ludacris, Trey Songz and Soulja Boy before being shelved. She collaborated with 2 Pistols on the track "Candy Coated Diamonds" which was released in 2008.

In April 2013, Bolling released her The Morning After mixtape on her official site. which featured the single "Sex" which was released in 2012.

Currently, she is at work on her debut EP, Tysexual which was set to be released independently in 2016. The album's first single "Tease" premiered on March 31, 2015.

Personal life
Bolling has publicly stated her song "Still in Love" was about an ex-girlfriend in high school.

Discography

Albums
 Introducing Tyra B (2006) (Shelved)
 Past Due (2008) (Shelved)
 Tysexual (2016)

Mixtapes
 The Morning After (2013)

Singles

Tours
 Destiny Fulfilled... and Lovin' It

References

External links
 Tyra B's official website

20th-century African-American women singers
American contemporary R&B singers
Living people
1985 births
LGBT African Americans
LGBT people from Virginia
American LGBT musicians
American LGBT rights activists
21st-century American women singers
21st-century African-American women singers